Walter Wolf Racing was a Formula One constructor active from 1977 to 1979, which won the first race the team entered. It was owned and run by Canadian Walter Wolf. The team was based in Reading, UK but raced with the Canadian licence.

History

1975–77
In 1975, the Austrian naturalized Canadian businessman Walter Wolf had started to appear at many of the F1 races during the season. A year later, he bought 60% of Frank Williams Racing Cars while agreeing to keep Frank Williams as manager of the team. Simultaneously Wolf bought the assets of Hesketh Racing and bought some equipment from Embassy Hill, both teams having recently withdrawn from F1. The team was based in the Williams facility at Reading but used most of the cars and equipment once owned by Hesketh Racing. The Hesketh 308C became known as the Wolf–Williams FW05 and soon afterwards Harvey Postlethwaite arrived as chief engineer. Jacky Ickx and Frenchman Michel Leclère were hired to drive. The team, however, was not very competitive and failed to qualify at a number of races during the year. Leclère left after the French Grand Prix and was replaced by Arturo Merzario while Ickx failed to perform and was dropped after the British Grand Prix, to be followed by a string of pay-drivers.

At the end of 1976, Wolf decided that the team needed restructuring. He removed Frank Williams from the manager's job and replaced him with Peter Warr from Team Lotus.  Disillusioned, Williams soon left the team, taking Patrick Head and several others to set up Williams Grand Prix Engineering. Postlethwaite's WR1 was a conventional Cosworth package but with Jody Scheckter hired from Tyrrell, the team won its first race in Argentina. Scheckter started tenth, and took advantage of six of the cars ahead of him retiring.  During the 1977 season, Scheckter went on to win the Monaco Grand Prix and the Canadian Grand Prix and also six other podium finishes, which enabled him to finish second to Niki Lauda in the World Championship and gave Wolf fourth place in the Constructors' Championship.

Around this time the team developed the WD1 sports car for Can-Am racing. The car was developed with Italian firm Dallara.

1978–79
The team remained the same for the 1978 season. Postlethwaite produced the WR5, a new car for the ground-effects era. This did not appear until the Belgian GP. Scheckter finished fourth in Spain and second in Germany but the WR5 soon made way for the WR6 with which he ended the year with a third in the US Grand Prix and second in Canada. He finished seventh in the World Championship.

In 1979, Scheckter was signed up by Ferrari and Wolf signed James Hunt to replace him. Postlethwaite designed the WR7 which ran with Olympus sponsorship. The car was not very successful and retired more than 7 times during the first half of the season. The WR8 soon followed. In mid-season Hunt decided to retire and Wolf quickly hired Keke Rosberg to replace him. The appearance of the WR9 did little to change the team's fortunes and at the end of the year Wolf grew tired of his F1 adventure and sold the team to Emerson Fittipaldi, who merged its assets into Fittipaldi Automotive.

A Wolf Racing WR1 is on display at the Canadian Motorsport Hall of Fame.

As of 2015, a Wolf Racing WR4 is being shown and raced at vintage F1 car events in the United States, campaigned by MotoGP world champion Eddie Lawson.

James Hunt's WR7 is on display at Brooklands Museum, Surrey, UK.

Other motorsport ventures

Walter Wolf was also involved in production cars, providing assistance to Lamborghini to develop the Countach in 1978 when the Italian constructor teetered on the brink of bankruptcy.

Complete Formula One World Championship results
(key)

Non-Championship results
(key) (results in bold indicate pole position; results in italics indicate fastest lap)

References

Sources

 
 

Formula One constructors
Formula One entrants
Canadian auto racing teams
Canadian racecar constructors
1976 establishments in the United Kingdom
1980 disestablishments in the United Kingdom
Auto racing teams established in 1976